Live '88 is the second live album by the English rock band Supertramp released in October 1988 on A&M Records.

Overview 
Originally recorded on two track cassette direct from the sound board for Rick Davies' use, Live '88 features the 4 piece lineup of the group augmented by additional players including Mark Hart (later a permanent member of the group and a future member of Crowded House) playing guitar and singing songs originally sung by Roger Hodgson. Live '88 was initially not intended for a commercial release, but Davies was so pleased with the vibe of the performances he authorized A&M to put it out.

Live '88 was only available in print very briefly. The album features two cover songs, "Hoochie Coochie Man" by Willie Dixon and "Don't You Lie To Me (I Get Evil)". The rest of the album consists of performances from the band's last set list to promote Free as a Bird (1987), along with a handful of numbers from throughout their career.

The band went on hiatus shortly after this album's release. Live '88 has not returned to print, unlike most of the Supertramp discography, and there are no songs from this release represented on the Retrospectacle: The Supertramp Anthology release.

Track listing 
 All songs by Rick Davies/Roger Hodgson, except where noted.Lead vocals by Rick Davies, except tracks 5 and 10 lead vocals by Mark Hart.

 "You Started Laughing" – 1:47
 "It's Alright" (Rick Davies) – 5:31
 "Not the Moment" (Davies) – 4:40
 "Bloody Well Right" – 6:20
 "Breakfast in America" 2:52
 "From Now On" – 7:56
 "Free as a Bird" (Davies) – 4:43
 "Oh Darling" – 3:45
 "Just Another Nervous Wreck" – 4:36
 "The Logical Song" – 4:07
 "I'm Your Hoochie Coochie Man" (Willie Dixon) – 4:32
 "Don't You Lie to Me (I Get Evil)" (Hudson Whittaker) – 2:48
 "Crime of the Century" – 6:42
 Tracks 8, 9 and 10 recorded at Palacio de los Deportes, Madrid, Spain 24 March 1988

Personnel

Supertramp

 Rick Davies – keyboards, vocals, harmonica
 Mark Hart – keyboards, guitar, vocals
 John Helliwell – saxophone, keyboards, backing vocals
 Dougie Thomson – bass, backing vocals
 Bob Siebenberg – drums

Guests

 Marty Walsh – guitar, backing vocals 
 Brad Cole – keyboards, saxophones
 Steve Reid – percussion

Charts

References

Albums produced by Tom Lord-Alge
1988 live albums
Supertramp live albums
A&M Records live albums